Nancy Reisman is an American author. She teaches creative writing at Vanderbilt University.

Biography
Reisman received her M.F.A. from the MFA Program for Poets & Writers at the University of Massachusetts Amherst and her B.A. from Tufts University.

Her stories have been included anthologies including Best American Short Stories, O. Henry Award Stories, and Jewish in America, High 5ive: An Anthology of Fiction From Ten Years of Five Points, Bestial Noise: A Tin House Reader Her work has also appeared in The Yale Review, The Kenyon Review, Tin House, New England Review, Five Points, Michigan Quarterly Review, SubTropics, Narrative, Glimmer Train, and other journals.

Awards
Her short story collection House Fires won the 1999 Iowa Short Fiction Award.  Her novel The First Desire won the Samuel Goldberg & Sons Foundation Prize for Jewish Fiction.  Reisman has also received fellowships from the National Endowment for the Arts, the Wisconsin Institute for Creative Writing, and the Fine Arts Work Center in Provincetown, Massachusetts. Reisman won an O. Henry Award and the Raymond Carver Short Story Award.  Her book, The First Desire, was also named a New York Times Notable Book of the Year.

Selected works
 House Fires (Iowa Short Fiction Award, University of Iowa Press)
 The First Desire (Pantheon)
 Trompe L'Oeil (Tin House Books, May 2015)

References

External links
 Book Page Interview
 Reisman at Random House
 Review in The Book Reporter
 Review in the New York Times

1961 births
Living people
American women writers
University of Massachusetts Amherst MFA Program for Poets & Writers alumni
Tufts University alumni
21st-century American women